Zamana or Zamānā ( "era") may refer to:

Films
Zamana (1938 film), a 1938 Bollywood Indian film
Zamana (1985 film), a 1985 Indian film
Zamana (1993 film), a 1993 Pakistani film
Zamana (2010 film), a 2010 Indian action drama film

People with the surname
Cezary Zamana (born 1967), Polish road-racing cyclist
Volodymyr Zamana (born 1959), Ukrainian general

Music
Zamana, an album by Karthik Raja
Naya Zamana, a 2004 album by Lata Mangeshkar
"Zamana", a song by Carte de Séjour

See also